Swimming with a Hole in My Body is the third solo album by American guitarist and composer Bill Connors, recorded in 1979 and released on the ECM label. Like his debut album, it is performed entirely on acoustic guitar.

Reception
The AllMusic review by Paul Kohler awarded the album 4½ stars calling it "Brilliant solo acoustic guitar with some overdubs. Required listening".

Track listing
All compositions by Bill Connors
 "Feet First" – 6:09   
 "Wade" – 3:24   
 "Sing and Swim" – 4:35   
 "Frog Stroke" – 5:08   
 "Surrender to the Water" – 10:45   
 "Survive" – 2:05   
 "With Strings Attached" – 2:47   
 "Breath" – 7:28 
 Recorded at Talent Studio in Oslo, Norway in August 1979

Personnel
Musicians
 Bill Connors – acoustic guitar

Production
 Producer: Manfred Eicher
 Engineer: Jan Erik Kongshaug
 Photography by Isio Saba & cover photo by Joel Meyerowitz
 Design by Barbara Wojirsch & Dieter Rehm

References

External links 
 Bill Connors - Hole in My Body (1980) album review by Paul Kohler, credits & releases at AllMusic
 Bill Connors - Hole in My Body (1980) album releases & credits at Discogs
 Bill Connors - Hole in My Body (1980) album to be listened as stream on Spotify

ECM Records albums
Bill Connors albums
1980 albums
Albums produced by Manfred Eicher
Instrumental albums